Wotho Airport is a public use airstrip at Wotho on Wotho Atoll, Marshall Islands.

Airlines and destinations

References 

Airports in the Marshall Islands